"She Got Me" is a song recorded by Swiss singer Luca Hänni. It was written by Hänni, Laurell Barker, Frazer Mac, Jenson Vaughan, Jon Hällgren, and Lukas Hällgren, while production was helmed by the latter two. It was released for digital download as a single on 8 March 2019. "She Got Me" represented  in the Eurovision Song Contest 2019 in Tel Aviv. It was performed during the second semi-final, where it qualified for the final. It finished in fourth place with 364 points, though this became Hänni's internationally successful song.

Eurovision Song Contest

The song represented Switzerland in the Eurovision Song Contest 2019, after Luca Hänni was internally selected by the Swiss broadcaster. On 28 January 2019, a special allocation draw was held which placed each country into one of the two semi-finals, as well as which half of the show they would perform in. Switzerland was placed into the second semi-final, to be held on 16 May 2019, and was scheduled to perform in the first half of the show. Once all the competing songs for the 2019 contest had been released, the running order for the semi-finals was decided by the show's producers rather than through another draw, so that similar songs were not placed next to each other. Switzerland performed in position 4. It qualified for the final, which took place on 18 May 2019. It finished in fourth place with 364 points. It became Switzerland's first Top 5 finish since 1993.

Track listing

Charts

Weekly charts

Year-end charts

Certifications

Release history

References

2019 songs
2019 singles
Eurovision songs of 2019
Eurovision songs of Switzerland
Luca Hänni songs
Songs written by Lukas Hällgren
Songs written by Luca Hänni
Songs written by Laurell (singer)